Sagitovo (Säğit) is a rural locality (a village) in Makansky Selsoviet, Khaybullinsky District, Bashkortostan, Russia. The population was 329 as of 2010. There are 4 streets.

Geography 
Sagitovo is located 27 km southeast of Akyar (the district's administrative centre) by road. Novocherkasskoye is the nearest rural locality.

References 

Rural localities in Khaybullinsky District